Edward Marszewski (also known as Ed Mar) is a publisher, artist and entrepreneur from Bridgeport, Chicago. He has been nicknamed the unofficial 'Mayor of Bridgeport'.

Publishing
Marszewski is co-director of the Public Media Institute which publishes Lumpen magazine and Mash Tun Journal. Marszewski also publishes Proximity Magazine and the Quarantine Times.

Restaurants
Marszewski is co-founder of Kimski, a Polish and Korean fusion restaurant, Maria’s Packaged Goods & Community Bar, Pizza Fried Chicken Ice Cream and Marz Community Brewing.

Arts and festivals

Along with others, Marszewski rented space for an art gallery called 'BuddY' in Wicker Park from 2002 until 2004 which operated as an "experimental cultural center", and as of April 2013, operates an art gallery called Co-Prosperity Sphere (named after a live action role-playing group faction in the film Darkon) which operates Lumpen Radio as low-power radio station WLPN-LP inside the gallery. Marszewski is founder of various festivals in Chicago such as Version Fest and Select Media Festival. Marszewski has written many articles for Lumpen magazine and is opening a new 'Buddy' in the Chicago Cultural Center.

External links
Mash Tun Journal official site
The Co-Prosperity Sphere official site
Buddy (in the Chicago Cultural Center)

References

Living people
Year of birth missing (living people)